Agonomycetes are members of a taxonomic class within the phylum Deuteromycota and include anamorphic fungi.

References

Deuteromycota